Stoki may refer to the following places:
Stoki, Lesser Poland Voivodeship (south Poland)
Stoki, Łódź Voivodeship (central Poland)
Stoki, Łódź, a neighbourhood in the city of Łódź
Stoki, Podlaskie Voivodeship (north-east Poland)
Stoki, Masovian Voivodeship (east-central Poland)
Stoki, Lubusz Voivodeship (west Poland)
Stoki, West Pomeranian Voivodeship (north-west Poland)
Stoki, Szczecin